Fredrik Nilsson (born 1 November 1969) is a former professional tennis player from Sweden.

Biography
Nilsson only competed professionally on tour for two years, mostly in doubles tournaments.

He won a Challenger title in Pescara in 1989 and that year made the semi-finals of Grand Prix events in both Saint-Vincent and Basel.

In 1990 he played doubles at the Lipton International Players Championships, one of the top tier tournaments now known as the Masters Series. His best performance in an ATP Tour tournament came at the 1990 Sanremo Open where he and partner Ola Jonsson were losing finalists. He made the main draw of the men's doubles at the 1990 US Open partnering Tobias Svantesson. They lost in the first round to Royce Deppe and Bret Garnett.

ATP Tour career finals

Doubles: 1 (0–1)

Challenger titles

Doubles: (1)

References

External links
 
 

1969 births
Living people
Swedish male tennis players
People from Kristianstad Municipality
Sportspeople from Skåne County